V. Kopperapadu is a panchayat accredited village in Ballikurava mandal of Prakasam district which is in Andhra Pradesh of India.

Villages in Prakasam district